Scarlet FM was an Independent Local Radio station, serving Llanelli, Burry Port, Pembrey and south Carmarthenshire, owned and operated by Town and Country Broadcasting (now Nation Broadcasting).

Originally broadcast as a separate station from the Foothold Centre in the Stebonheath area of Llanelli, the station later moved to studios in Narberth in neighbouring Pembrokeshire.

After a period of dual-branding, the Llanelli frequency now carries all programming and branding from Radio Carmarthenshire and the rest of the Nation Broadcasting network of local stations, including countywide news, travel and community information, alongside chart music from the 1980s to the present day.

Llanelli
Radio stations in Wales
Defunct radio stations in the United Kingdom
Radio stations established in 2002
2002 establishments in Wales
Radio stations disestablished in 2016
2016 disestablishments in Wales